The City of Tshwane (Pretoria metropolitan area) like most South African metropolitan areas uses Metropolitan or "M" routes for important intra-city routes, a layer below National (N) roads and Regional (R) roads. Each city's M roads are independently numbered.

Table of M roads

See also 
 Numbered Routes in South Africa

References 

Roads in South Africa
Metropolitan Routes in Pretoria